The following outline serves as an overview of and topical guide to the Marvel Cinematic Universe (MCU), a media franchise and shared universe that consists of films and television series from Marvel Studios, television series from Marvel Television, and other media.

Organizations 
 Marvel Studios, which created the MCU and is the production company for the films, some television series, as well as other media, is currently owned by the Walt Disney Company and is a part of Walt Disney Studios.
 Marvel Television, which was the production company for some television series, is currently owned by the Walt Disney Company and is a division of Marvel Studios.

Influential people 

 Avi Arad – Founder of Marvel Studios
 Kevin Feige – Marvel Studios President and Chief Creative Officer of Marvel Entertainment
 Jeph Loeb – Former Marvel Television Executive Vice President
 Stan Lee – Creator or co-creator of many MCU characters, who frequently made cameo appearances

Content

Feature films

The Infinity Saga

The Multiverse Saga

Future

Television series

Marvel Television series

Marvel Studios series 
All Marvel Studios series will be or are being released on Disney+.

Future

Television specials 
All television specials will be or are being released on Disney+, and are marketed as "Marvel Studios Special Presentations".

Future

Short films

Marvel One-Shots

Team Thor

I Am Groot

Digital series

Tie-in comic books

Music

Inspired media

Theme park attractions 
 Avengers Campus
 Doctor Strange: Journey into the Mystic Arts
 Iron Man Experience
 Guardians of the Galaxy – Mission: Breakout!
 Ant-Man and The Wasp: Nano Battle!
 Web Slingers: A Spider-Man Adventure
 Iron Man roller coaster
 Guardians of the Galaxy: Cosmic Rewind

Docuseries

Marvel Studios: Legends

Marvel Studios: Assembled

Recurring characters

Features 

 Teams and organizations of the Marvel Cinematic Universe
 Species of the Marvel Cinematic Universe

Accolades 
 List of accolades received by Marvel Cinematic Universe films
 List of accolades received by Marvel Cinematic Universe television series

Notes

References 

Marvel Cinematic Universe
Marvel Cinematic Universe